The 2015–16 Indiana Hoosiers women's basketball team represented Indiana University Bloomington during the 2015–16 NCAA Division I women's basketball season. The Hoosiers, led by second year head coach Teri Moren, play their home games at the Assembly Hall and are members of the Big Ten Conference. They finished the season 21–12, 12–6 in Big Ten play to finish in fourth place. They lost in the quarterfinals of the Big Ten women's tournament to Northwestern. They received an at-large bid to the NCAA women's basketball tournament, which was their first trip since 2002. They defeated Georgia in the first round before losing to Notre Dame in the second round.

Roster

Schedule

|-
!colspan=9 style="background:#7D110C; color:white;"| Exhibition

|-
!colspan=9 style="background:#7D110C; color:white;"| Non-conference regular season

|-
!colspan=9 style="background:#7D110C; color:white;"| Big Ten regular Season

|-
!colspan=9 style="background:#7D110C; color:white;"| Big Ten Women's Tournament

|-
!colspan=9 style="background:#7D110C; color:white;"| NCAA Women's Tournament

Rankings

See also
2015–16 Indiana Hoosiers men's basketball team

References

Indiana Hoosiers women's basketball seasons
Indiana
Indiana
Indiana Hoosiers
Indiana Hoosiers